Avril Stefan Malan (born 9 April 1937) is a former South African rugby union player.

Playing career
Malan completed school at the age of sixteen, after which he furthered his studies at Stellenbosch University. He made his senior provincial debut for Western Province in 1957 and after completing his studies he relocated to Johannesburg and continued his playing career with Transvaal.

Malan made his test debut for the Springboks in 1960 against the touring New Zealand team in the first test played on 25 June 1960 at Ellis Park in Johannesburg. Later during the 1960 test series against the All Blacks, for the third and fourth Tests, Malan was named Springbok captain. He continued to captain the Springboks on ten occasions, though not continuously. He also played in twenty tour matches, scoring one try.

Test history

See also
List of South Africa national rugby union players – Springbok no. 361

References

1937 births
Living people
South African rugby union players
South Africa international rugby union players
Western Province (rugby union) players
Golden Lions players
Rugby union players from Pretoria
Stellenbosch University alumni
Rugby union locks